Anisolepis grilli, commonly known as Boulenger's tree lizard , is a species of lizard in the family  Leiosauridae. It is native to Brazil, Argentina, and Uruguay.

References

Anisolepis
Reptiles described in 1891
Reptiles of Brazil
Reptiles of Argentina
Reptiles of Uruguay
Taxa named by George Albert Boulenger